Loreta Kančytė (born 20 July 1994) is a Lithuanian long-distance runner. In 2020, she competed in the women's half marathon at the 2020 World Athletics Half Marathon Championships held in Gdynia, Poland.

In 2020, she won the silver medal in the women's 10,000 metre event at the 2020 Lithuanian Athletics Championships held in Palanga, Lithuania.

References

External links 
 

Living people
1994 births
Place of birth missing (living people)
Lithuanian female long-distance runners
20th-century Lithuanian women
21st-century Lithuanian women